Nicolae "Nicky" Petrescu (2 April 1913 – 1991) was a Romanian professional footballer and football manager.

Playing career
Nicolae Petrescu was born on 2 April 1913 in Bucharest, Romania and spent his entire playing career at local club Juventus, making his debut for the club in the last round of the 1930–31 București championship when coach Emerich Vogl used him the whole game in a 9–0 victory against Sportul Studențesc București. In the following years, Petrescu started to play more often, consolidating his place in the first 11 of the team, helping it gain promotion to Divizia A by the end of the 1932–33 season, his style of play being praised by the Gazeta Sporturilor newspaper after a 3–2 victory in front of Sportul Studențesc:"Insistent attacks started from the ranks of The Black and Whites (Sportul) are hardly stopped by the defense of The Red and Blues (Juventus). Petrescu is at ease, moving like a swashbuckler among his opponents, whom he regularly deprives of the ball". In the first round of the following season, he made his Divizia A debut on 17 September 1933 when coach Ladislau Csillag used him in all the minutes of a 3–1 away victory in front of Ripensia Timișoara. He scored his first and only goal of his career in the eight-finals of the 1935–36 Cupa României in a 3–1 victory against Maccabi București, Juventus managing to reach the semi-finals of that edition, a performance which was repeated in the following season. In the last years of his career, Petrescu played more rarely and the team's results were poorer season after season, eventually relegating by the end of the 1939–40 season but he stayed with the club helping it promote after one season by contributing with 14 appearances, however he did not get to play again in Divizia A as the championship was interrupted because of World War II, thus ending his playing career in which he gained a total of 107 Divizia A appearances and 16 matches with one goal scored in Cupa României.

Managerial career
Nicolae Petrescu began his managerial career at the club he spent his entire playing career, Juventus București, guiding it in the first half of the 1945–46 București championship, as in the second half he was replaced with Emerich Vogl who kept him in his staff as a assistant, a position he held in the following two seasons when the team played in Divizia A. Afterwards he worked at Poiana Câmpina and Vulcan București, before being employed by the Romanian Football Federation to coach Romanian youth teams from 1953 until 1957, including the under-21 side, also in 1957 he was Gheorghe Popescu I's assistant at the senior squad. From 1957 until 1958 he was head coach at CCA București, then moved to Dinamo Obor București for two years, after which he came back to working with juniors, being the coordinator coach of Dinamo București's youth center. In the following years Nicolae Petrescu continued to work at youth level, being between 1962 and 1964 the head of the "23 August" junior center and from 1964 until 1968 he coached Romania's under-21 team. For a short period he retired from the field and became head of the Psychological Research Laboratory at the Physical Education and Sports Research Center, returning in 1969 to work again for the Romanian Football Federation as a federal coach for one year. In 1971 he went to work in Turkey as a technical director for the Turkish Football Federation, later that year being named head coach of the national team for one game, a 1–0 home victory in front of Poland at the Euro 1972 qualifiers. In 1972 he went to coach Altay until 1973, returning to Romania where from 1974 until 1976 he held the position of president of the Central College of Coaches within the Romanian Football Federation. In his final years of coaching he worked from 1976 until 1977 as the coordinator of Dinamo București's youth center and had another experience in Turkey at Samsunspor, ending his career in 1978. Petrescu died in 1991 at age 78.

Writing
Nicolae Petrescu wrote two volumes about football:
 Carte pentru fotbaliștii de mâine (Book for tomorrow's footballers) 
 Fotbal pe culmile performanței (Football at the peak of performance)

Honours

Player
Juventus București
Divizia B: 1940–41

References

External links

1913 births
1991 deaths
Footballers from Bucharest
Romanian footballers
Romanian football managers
Romanian expatriate football managers
Liga I players
Liga II players
Liga I managers
FC Petrolul Ploiești players
FC Petrolul Ploiești managers
FC Steaua București managers
Altay S.K. managers
Samsunspor managers
Turkey national football team managers
Association football midfielders
Romanian expatriate sportspeople in Turkey
Romanian writers
Romanian male writers
20th-century Romanian writers
20th-century Romanian male writers